Nicolás Franco Bahamonde (1 July 1891 – 15 April 1977)  was a Spanish military and politician.

Biography
Officer in the Naval Engineer Corps of the Spanish Navy, in 1935 he was director of the Merchant Navy.

He was head of the General Secretariat of the Head of State in the government of his brother, the general Francisco Franco, from 1936 to 1938. 

Nicolás Franco served as ambassador to Portugal and was the chief Spanish architect and negotiator of the Iberian Pact.
In 1942 he was promoted to general of the naval engineering corps.

He was married to María Isabel Pascual del Pobil y Ravello, with whom he had a son, Nicolás Franco y Pascual de Pobil.

References 

20th-century Spanish politicians
Spanish generals
1891 births
1977 deaths
FET y de las JONS politicians